Terry, Blair & Anouchka were a musical group, active in the early 1990s. They were formed by Coventry-born singer Terry Hall, American musician Blair Booth and jeweller Anouchka Grose.

Terry Hall was previously a founding member and lead singer of the British ska group the Specials, the forefathers of the 2 tone era. This was before leaving with two other members to form the short-lived Fun Boy Three in 1981. Hall later formed the Colourfield in 1984.

History
Terry, Blair & Anouchka were formed shortly after the dissolution of Terry's previous musical project the Colourfield. All three members shared a love for 1960s pop, as well as kitschy mainstream pop, as evidenced on the trio's cover of Captain & Tennille's "Love Will Keep Us Together". Their debut single "Missing" was released in the autumn of 1989 and peaked at number 75 on the UK Singles Chart. The trio's second single, "Ultra Modern Nursery Rhyme", reached number 77. Their debut album, also called Ultra Modern Nursery Rhymes, was released in February 1990. The group split shortly afterwards.

Blair Booth formed Oui 3 with Philipp Erb and Trevor Miles in 1991. Their most notable hit single was "Break from the Old Routine" in 1993.

In 1992, Terry Hall collaborated with Dave Stewart of Eurythmics under the name Vegas, before releasing a self-titled album that year.

Discography
Albums

Singles

References

English pop music groups
British musical trios
Cherry Red Records artists
Musical groups established in 1989
Musical groups disestablished in 1992
1989 establishments in England
1992 disestablishments in England